The 2015 Big South women's basketball tournament was the postseason women's basketball tournament for the Big South Conference that took place March 3–8, 2015, at the HTC Center in Conway, South Carolina. All rounds after 1st were broadcast on ESPN3, 1st Round on Big South Network.

Format
All 11 teams were eligible for the tournament.

Seeds

Schedule

*Game times in Eastern Time. #Rankings denote tournament seeding.

Bracket

References

2014–15 NCAA Division I women's basketball season
Big South Conference women's basketball tournament